Central Manor is an unincorporated community in Manor Township in Lancaster County, Pennsylvania, United States. Central Manor is located at the intersection of Pennsylvania Route 999 and Central Manor Road.

References

Unincorporated communities in Lancaster County, Pennsylvania
Unincorporated communities in Pennsylvania